Mount Oliver is a south neighborhood of Pittsburgh, Pennsylvania.  It has a zip code of 15210, and has representation on Pittsburgh City Council by the council member for District 3 (Central South Neighborhoods).  It is adjacent to, but distinct from, the borough of Mount Oliver.

References

External links
 Borough of Mount Oliver (official site)
Interactive Pittsburgh Neighborhoods Map

See also
 List of Pittsburgh neighborhoods
Neighborhoods in Pittsburgh